Kosciusko is a city in Attala County, Mississippi, United States. The population was 7,402 at the 2010 census. It is the county seat of Attala County.

History
Shortly before the War of 1812, David Choate, a French trader along with his wife, a Choctaw, opened the Choate Stand, an inn along the Natchez Trace. They chose a location near the intersection of the trace and a cross path that led to the Creek Indian Nation, where there was a natural spring to provide fresh water, at the approximate location of the current town square. Journals from the war of 1812 indicate that Andrew Jackson received supplies at Choate Stand. In 1850, the Choate family was forcibly removed to Indian Territory in Oklahoma by the Indian Removal Act, signed by Andrew Jackson. In 2017 Kosciusko inaugurated an annual Return to Redbud Springs Festival to honor this history.

The settlement was at one time named Red Bud Springs for a natural spring that was present in the city. Later, Redbud Springs was renamed Kosciusko, for General Tadeusz Kościuszko, a Polish officer who served with the Continental Army and assisted its military efforts during the American Revolution. His name has been anglicized as 'Kosciusko'.

Throughout the 19th century, cotton was the predominant crop, and remains important in the area.

Kosciusko was the location of Magnolia Bible College from 1976 to 2008.

Geography

Climate
The climate is characterized by hot, humid summers and generally mild to cool winters. According to the Köppen Climate Classification system, Kosciusko has a humid subtropical climate, abbreviated "Cfa" on climate maps.

The data below are from the WRCC, compiled from 1893 to the time this chart was created (July 2018).

Demographics

2020 census

As of the 2020 United States Census, there were 7,114 people, 2,645 households, and 1,720 families residing in the city.

2000 census
As of the census of 2000, there were 7,372 people, 2,885 households, and 1,906 families residing in the city. The population density was 977.8 people per square mile (377.5/km2). There were 3,174 housing units at an average density of 421.0 per square mile (162.5/km2). The racial makeup of the city was 53.66% White, 44.57% African American, 0.16% Native American, 0.46% Asian, 0.60% from other races, and 0.54% from two or more races. Hispanic or Latino of any race were 1.06% of the population.

There were 2,885 households, out of which 31.7% had children under the age of 18 living with them, 40.2% were married couples living together, 21.9% had a female householder with no husband present, and 33.9% were non-families. 31.2% of all households were made up of individuals, and 17.5% had someone living alone who was 65 years of age or older. The average household size was 2.43 and the average family size was 3.04.

In the city, the population was spread out, with 26.2% under the age of 18, 9.5% from 18 to 24, 23.9% from 25 to 44, 19.8% from 45 to 64, and 20.6% who were 65 years of age or older. The median age was 37 years. For every 100 females, there were 82.7 males. For every 100 females age 18 and over, there were 77.1 males.

The median income for a household in the city was $21,737, and the median income for a family was $29,000. Males had a median income of $27,423 versus $16,487 for females. The per capita income for the city was $13,478. About 20.9% of families and 24.2% of the population were below the poverty line, including 31.9% of those under age 18 and 20.1% of those age 65 or over.

Arts and culture
Kosciusko has hosted the Central Mississippi Fair for over 100 years.

Kosciusko has been featured as part of the Mississippi Blues Trail since 2009.

Education
The city of Kosciusko is served by the Kosciusko School District and includes Kosciusko Senior High School.

Notable people
 Dave Barnes, singer-songwriter and musician for Razor & Tie
 Billy Ray Bates, professional basketball player
 Eva Webb Dodd, Anna Boyd Ellington, and Mary Comfort Leonard, founders of the Delta Gamma fraternity
 Clarence Harmon, former NFL running back for the Washington Redskins
 James Meredith, civil rights figure
 Charlie Musselwhite, blues harmonica player and band leader
 Jason Niles, lawyer, newspaper editor, and politician
 Topher Payne, playwright
 Blanche Colton Williams, author, editor, department head and professor of English literature, and pioneer in women’s higher education.
 Oprah Winfrey, billionaire media entrepreneur and producer, actress, author, philanthropist, and former talk show host.
 Marc Woodard, former NFL linebacker for the Philadelphia Eagles

Gallery

References

External links

 City of Kosciusko official website

 
Cities in Attala County, Mississippi
Cities in Mississippi
County seats in Mississippi